These are the results for the 41st edition of the Ronde van Nederland cycling race, which was held from August 28 to September 1, 2001. The race started in Rotterdam and finished in Landgraaf.

Stages

28-08-2001: Rotterdam-Tilburg, 186 km

29-08-2001: Tiel-Nijverdal, 184 km

30-08-2001: Nijverdal-Denekamp, 83 km

30-08-2001: Nordhorn (GER)-Denekamp, 23 km

31-08-2001: Markelo/Goor-Venlo, 192 km

01-09-2001: Blerick-Landgraaf, 228 km

Final classification

External links
Wielersite Results

Ronde van Nederland
2001 in road cycling
2001 in Dutch sport